The Wales 'C' National Team is a football team that represents the Football Association of Wales governed Welsh football league system. The team is selected using players that play in the Cymru Premier, the highest level of Welsh football.

Home matches are played at various grounds around the country. The Wales Semi Pro team competed in both the Four Nations Tournament and the International Challenge Trophy.

Recent results

Players

Current squad

Squad to face England C at Altrincham on 21 March 2023.

Managers
  Mark Jones (2018–present)
  Terry Boyle (2008–20??)
  Tony Pennock (2003–2008)

Under 18 Squad
The FAW runs a semi-professional Under 18 squad using players primarily drawn from Welsh Premier League clubs.

Notable players 
Neil Taylor

Honours

References 

S
European national semi-professional association football teams